Summer Tour may refer to:

Concert tours
Summer Tour (Depeche Mode), 1994
Summer Tour 2004 (Blink-182 and No Doubt)
Summer Tour (Paul McCartney), 2004
Summer Tour (Erykah Badu), 2006
Summer Tour (Elena Paparizou), 2008
Summer Tour 2008 (Tiësto and Armani Exchange)
Summer Tour 2009 (Chickenfoot)
Summer Tour (Demi Lovato), 2009
2009 Summer Tour (No Doubt)
2011 Summer Tour (Maroon 5 and Train), 2011
Summer Tour (Mika), 2011
Summer Tour (Jennifer Lopez), 2012
Summer Tour (Miranda Cosgrove), 2012
Summer Tour (Big Time Rush and Victoria Justice), 2013
Summer Tour (Bridgit Mendler), 2013
2013 Summer Tour (Matchbox Twenty and Goo Goo Dolls)
2013 Summer Tour (Toni Braxton)
Summer Tour (Lana Del Rey), 2015
Summer Tour (Celine Dion), 2016
Summer Tour 2016 (Weezer and Panic! at the Disco)

Albums
Summer Tour 2007 (EP), a 2007 EP by Rolo Tomassi
Summer Tour 2007 Final Time – Kotoba no Chikara, a 2007 video EP by Arashi
2010 Summer Tour EP, a 2010 EP by Paramore

See also